This is a list of airlines currently operating in Ghana.

See also
 List of airlines
 List of defunct airlines of Ghana

Ghana

Airlines
Airlines
Ghana